I Don't Luv U is a 2013 Indian Hindi-language romantic drama film, starring Ruslaan Mumtaz and Chetna Pande in the lead roles. The film is produced by Dr. Anil Kumar Sharma and written and directed by Amit Kasaria under the banner of Amrapali Media Vision. The film was released on 17 May 2013 in India.

Story

Yuvaan Kapoor (Ruslaan Mumtaz) a 19-year-old college student, is being rushed to the hospital after falling from a balcony. The police investigator attending the scene recognises Yuvaan as the same student who was involved in a college MMS sex scandal. The possibility of suicide is considered, since the scandal reached nationwide attention. The inspector finds a diary at the scene and begins to read it.

It is shown that Yuvaan meets Aayra Saigal (Chetna Pande), and starts to develop feelings for her. His romantic advances are initially rejected and he is disheartened. Slowly, Aarya sees what a kind and loving person Yuvaan is, and starts becoming friendly towards him. Their friendship deepens and they find that they cannot be away from each other for even a day. Aayra realises that she loves Yuvaan and writes this in her personal diary. One day, Aarya finds herself alone at home and she calls Yuvaan, who excitedly goes to her house where they start taking pictures. Yuvaan mistakenly records them hugging and holding each other. He sets the phone down on a table, unaware that it is still recording. Yuvaan kisses Aayra, and unzips her dress. Aayra becomes scared and starts to cry since she didn't know he would do that, and Yuvaan zips her dress back up. The two reconcile and hug.

The inspector reads this and is shocked to find out the truth, since that is not how the story was portrayed in the media and amongst the public. He goes to the hospital to further question Yuvaan, but he is in critical condition waiting for an operation. The inspector questions Yuvaans friend Amey to find out how the MMS was leaked to the public. Amey says that the day after the recording was made, Yuvaan and his friends planned to go out, but before leaving they met Aayra who gave him her diary in which she expresses her love for him.
While they are on their trip, Yuvaans friend Lovely takes his phone and does not return it. When they return from the outing, Amey receives a call from a friend, saying that an MMS recording of Aayra and Yuvaan had been leaked in the whole college and the media was starting to pick up on it. Yuvaan gets arrested and it turns into a nationwide scandal. After he is released on bail, Yuvaan tries to minimize the damage caused to Aarya and remove her name from the incident but it is too late. He decides to jump off the balcony with the diary. Hearing of the suicide attempt, the public sympathize with Yuvaan, but still demean Aarya. She is mocked and ostracized in society.

A month after his fall, Yuvaan is healed and goes to meet Aarya. He tells her how much he loves her and asks for forgiveness. Aayra forgives him but also says as his apology won't bring her reputation back. She reveals that her family is moving abroad to escape the scandal and that she may never see him again.
 
Sometime later, Yuvaan is being interviewed by a news channel. The news anchor asks him if Aarya has forgiven him, since the entire country now sympathizes with him. He says that he does not know if she had forgiven him, but all he does know is that he still loves her. Later on, it is revealed that Aayra's parents have left India but she chose to stay behind in order to reunite with Yuvaan.

Cast

 Chetna Pande as Aayra Sehgal
 Ruslaan Mumtaz as Yuvaan Kapoor
 Murali Sharma as the cop investigating Yuvaan's suicide
 Ragesh Asthana
 Jass Bhatia as Lovely
 Ravi Khemu
 Paramjyot Singh

Soundtrack

The soundtrack album has eleven songs, ten of them composed by the music duo Aman Pant - Benson Baby. Amit Kasaria wrote and composed the song "Ishq Ki #@@ Ki", which was sung by Mika Singh.

Track listings

Critical reception

The Times of India gave the film a rating of 2.5 out of 5 saying that, "The film has a lot to offer, especially for youngsters but mentions of too many moralistic issues leave you frustrated." Gaurav Malani of The Economic Times gave the film a rating of 1.5 out of 5 saying that, "The makers lack the sensibility and the sensitivity to handle an intricate issue like MMS and are rather myopic in their outlook." Mohar Basu of Koimoi gave the film a rating of 0.5 out of 5 saying that, "I Don’t Luv U is a film that doesn’t deserve to even release going by its non story, non script and non film aspects." Martin D'Souza of Glamsham gave the film a rating of 2 out of 5 saying that, "At the heart of I DON'T LUV U lies a very relevant issue. But sadly, that's left for too late by which time you have been treated to some rather raw, amateurish scenes in college and teenage time pass on the campus." Tushar Joshi of DNA India gave the film a rating of 1 out of 5 saying that, "I Don't Luv U is a futile exercise in using a MMS controversy as a tool to lure the audience into watching a half baked script, some cringe worthy scenes and performances that look like an audition gone bad."

References

External links
 

2010s Hindi-language films
2013 films
Indian romantic drama films
2013 romantic drama films